Michael Thomas Leonard (2 December 1914 – 23 May 1984) was an Australian rules footballer who played with South Melbourne in the Victorian Football League (VFL).

Notes

External links 

1914 births
1984 deaths
Australian rules footballers from Victoria (Australia)
Sydney Swans players
Coburg Football Club players